Eupithecia inexplicabilis is a moth in the family Geometridae. It is found in Kyrgyzstan.

References

Moths described in 1982
inexplicabilis
Moths of Asia